Super Nova is clone of Atari, Inc.'s Asteroids arcade game published by Big Five Software for the TRS-80 in 1980. Co-author Bill Hogue called Super Nova "the game that started the company."

Gameplay
Super Nova is a game in which the player uses missiles to blow asteroids into smaller chunks, and then split them into smaller hunks which can then be completely destroyed.

Reception
Jon Mishcon reviewed Super Nova in The Space Gamer No. 36. Mishcon commented that "I found this game to be a real challenge. Recommended for any arcade buff."

Reviews
Moves #57, p14

References

External links
Review in 80-U.S
Review in 80 Micro
Review in Byte
Review in Creative Computing

1980 video games
Big Five Software games
Single-player video games
TRS-80 games
TRS-80-only games
Video game clones
Video games developed in the United States